Monobamba District is one of thirty-four districts of the province Jauja in Peru.

See also 
 Marayrasu

References

External links
  Municipal web site